I Say Mamamoo: The Best (stylized in all caps), sometimes referred to as The Best, is the first compilation album by South Korean girl group Mamamoo. It was released on September 15, 2021 by RBW. The album features 23 tracks, including remixes and re-recorded versions of some of the group's biggest hits. It includes two original tracks, "Mumumumuch" and "Happier Than Ever," with the former being released as the lead and only official single from the album alongside the release of the album itself.

Background and release 
Following the release of their eleventh EP WAW in June 2021 and their online concert of the same name in August, reports emerged that Mamamoo were preparing a greatest hits album to be released in September. The album, which would mark the first group release after member Wheein declined to renew her contract with record label RBW, was to celebrate seven years as a group. In early September, the group confirmed the album's title, cover, and release date through their social media. I Say Mamamoo: The Best was released in full on September 15, 2021. The Japanese version of the album was released on March 23, 2022.

Promotion 
Prior to the album's release, Mamamoo performed the two new original songs, "Mumumumuch" and "Happier Than Ever," during their August 2021 online concert, alongside several of the 2021 remix versions included on the album. Compared to their other albums, The Best received minimal promotions and the group opted to not perform on South Korean music programs, as the album was considered a gift to fans rather than an official comeback.

Single 
"Mumumumuch" was released as the album's lead and only single on September 15, 2021, coinciding with the release of the album itself. The song is a "dance-pop track with a rhythmical bass line that describes just how much they love someone and how having those feelings makes them shine as well." It also "expresses love for their fans and was included in the compilation album as a special gift." In the music video, released on September 15, the four members of Mamamoo "spend quality time together in a lavish hotel suite, where they have drinks, cakes and more" and "perform at a resort, overlooking vibrant purple hills," as per NME.

Critical reception 
Puah Ziwei of NME described the compilation as a rarity for K-pop groups but maintained that Mamamoo executed the album's concept well, saying that it "largely lives up to the group's legacy." He dubbed the rock version of their 2019 single "Gogobebe" a stand-out track, though he stated that the two new tracks felt "par for the course for K-pop in the 2020s" and "might be viewed in a slightly more positive light" had they been released as standalone singles. On the review aggregator Album of the Year, I Say Mamamoo: The Best holds a user score of 64.

Commercial performance 
I Say Mamamoo: The Best recorded 6,981 sales on its first day of release, a figure much smaller than their previous 2021 release WAW, which recorded nearly 40,000 first-day sales. Due to the success of the album in digital platforms, fans of the group blamed the group's label, RBW, for not being able to print enough copies of the album to keep up with demand, leading to it quickly selling out on various retailers, though the company made no statement on the matter. The album went on to debut at number eight on the Gaon Album Chart for the 38th issued week of 2021, making it their 14th top-ten album. On the monthly album chart for September 2021, the album placed at number 25, selling 29,996 physical copies; it dropped one place to number 26 for the month of October, with 29,159 copies sold for a total of 59,155 copies. Globally, The Best reached number one on the iTunes charts in 12 regions. As of December 2022, the album has generated more than 37 million streams on music streaming platform Spotify and more than four million streams on YouTube Music.

Lead single "Mumumumuch" debuted and peaked at number 102 on the Gaon Digital Chart and number eight on the Gaon Download Chart, with each of the 23 tracks from The Best entering the Download Chart as well.

Track listing

Charts

Weekly charts

Monthly charts

Release history

References 

2021 compilation albums
Mamamoo albums